Thomas Michael McMahon (29 December 1907 – 11 December 1975) was an Australian rules footballer who played with South Melbourne and Melbourne in the Victorian Football League (VFL).

He later served in the Australian Army in World War II.

Notes

External links 

1907 births
Australian rules footballers from Victoria (Australia)
Players of Australian handball
Sydney Swans players
Melbourne Football Club players
Australian military personnel of World War II
1975 deaths